Chiquita W. Brooks-LaSure is an American healthcare policy official who is the administrator of the Centers for Medicare & Medicaid Services in the Biden administration since May 2021.

Education 
Brooks-LaSure earned her Bachelor of Arts from Princeton University in 1996 and a Master of Public Policy from the McCourt School of Public Policy of Georgetown University in 1999.

Career 
She began her career as a program examiner and lead Medicaid analyst in the Office of Management and Budget. In that role, she also analyzed aspects of Medicare spending. She also worked as a staffer for Democratic members of the United States House Committee on Ways and Means before joining the Center for Consumer Information and Insurance Oversight, where she was tasked with managing policy related to the Affordable Care Act. After the end of the Obama administration, Brooks-LaSure became the managing director of the Health Division of national law firm Manatt, Phelps & Phillips. She also served on the Virginia Health Benefit Exchange Advisory Committee.

Biden administration
On February 19, 2021, President Joe Biden nominated Brooks-LaSure to be the next administrator of the Centers for Medicare and Medicaid Services (CMS). The United States Senate Committee on Finance held hearings on her nomination on April 15, 2021. On April 22, 2021, the committee deadlocked on her nomination in a party-line vote, which resulted in an additional discharge vote being needed for her nomination to appear before the full Senate for a confirmation vote. On May 12, 2021, her nomination was discharged from the committee by a vote of 51–48. On May 25, 2021, Brooks-LaSure was confirmed by the Senate by a vote of 55–44. On May 27, 2021, she was sworn in by Secretary Xavier Becerra.

References 

Living people
Place of birth missing (living people)
Year of birth missing (living people)
Biden administration personnel
McCourt School of Public Policy alumni
Princeton University alumni
Obama administration personnel
United States congressional aides
United States Office of Management and Budget officials